Lanesville may refer to:
Lanesville, Indiana
Lanesville, New York, a hamlet in Greene County, New York
Lanesville, Nova Scotia
Lanesville, Virginia
Lanesville, a neighborhood of Gloucester, Massachusetts
Lanesville, Connecticut